Écho de la Sambre (literally, "The Sambre Echo") was a French-language weekly socialist newspaper published from Marchienne-au-Pont, Belgium. The paper was started in 1915.

References

Defunct newspapers published in Belgium
Defunct weekly newspapers
French-language newspapers published in Belgium
Publications established in 1915
Publications with year of disestablishment missing
Socialist newspapers
Socialism in Belgium